C. A. Balaramasounarin was an Indian civil servant and administrator. He was the administrator of Mahe from  15 June 1973 to 20 July 1973 and 1 July 1977 to 21 August 1977.

References 

 

Year of birth missing
Possibly living people
Administrators of Mahe
Place of birth missing